Edward Spears (born November 29, 1982) is an American actor. He is a member of the Kul Wicasa Oyate Lakota (often called "Sioux") Lower Brulé Sioux Tribe of South Dakota.

Early life
Spears was born in Chamberlain, South Dakota on the Lower Brulé Lakota Sioux Reservation. He has five brothers and one sister; his older brother Michael is also an actor. Spears grew up on the Lower Brulé Indian Reservation until the first grade when his family moved to Pierre, South Dakota. After that, his family moved to Aberdeen, South Dakota where he grew up and attended Simmons Middle School and Aberdeen Central High School.

Career

Acting
Spears has been in the spotlight since age ten, starting with his first role in TNT's production of Geronimo, which was shot in Arizona.

Spears has said his most rewarding role to date was Shane Chasing Horse in the 2003 film Dreamkeeper.

When cast for the lead in the 2004 film Black Cloud (directed by Rick Schroder), he trained for three months with boxing trainer Jimmy Gambia to perfect his boxing skills before filming started. The film is about a Navajo boxer training for the Golden Gloves with the promise of a spot at the Olympics while struggling with the secrets of his family's past. One of the scenes was filmed in Las Vegas during the 2003 Golden Gloves National Championship.

In 2011 and 2012, Spears played the popular  Joseph Black Moon in AMC's TV series, Hell On Wheels. Spears was the voice of "Grey Beaver" in the 2018 animated film White Fang.

Recent TV spots include a 2019 supporting role in Season 2 of the TV series Yellowstone and a cameo in Season 2 of Rutherford Falls on Peacock.

Other work
In 2005, Spears and his brother Michael modeled for Cochiti Pueblo fashion designer Virgil Ortiz for his "Indigene" clothing line, and were featured on the cover of the August 2005 issue of New Mexico Magazine.

Awards
FAITA Best Actor Award in 2004 for Hallmark Entertainment's miniseries Dreamkeeper.
Phoenix Film Festival Best Actor Award in 2004 for his lead role in Black Cloud.
Bronze Wrangler Award at the Western Heritage Awards in 2012 for lead actor in Yellow Rock
Red Nation Film Festival and Awards: Nominated in 2014 for Best Supporting Actor in TV Movie, Miniseries, Special, Comedy or Pilot as Joseph Black Moon in Hell on Wheels .

Personal life
Spears co-hosted the 39th Annual American Indian Film Institute Awards this November along with actress Tonantzin Carmelo. Spears attended and was a mentor at the second annual HatcH Audiovisual Festival in Bozeman, Montana in October 2005. HatcH is a film and arts festival whose mission is to provide mentorship, education, inspiration, and recognition to the next generation of creative innovators.

Spears and his brother Michael have also been active with Native Wind and the COUP (Intertribal Council on Utility Policy) Native Energy, of which their father Patrick Spears was formerly president. COUP was formed in 1994 to provide a forum for utility issues discussion from regulatory and economic perspectives.

Spears speaks some Lakota. He is an avid outdoorsman and a Traditional and Grass dancer. He also travels nationally as a keynote speaker. He currently resides in Montana.

Filmography

References

External links
 
 
 Spears Brothers Fans 

American male film actors
Native American male actors
Native American actors
1982 births
Living people
Male models from South Dakota
American environmentalists
Brulé people
Male actors from South Dakota
Native American environmentalists
People from Chamberlain, South Dakota
People from Aberdeen, South Dakota
People from Pierre, South Dakota
20th-century American male actors
21st-century American male actors